The Eighth Doctor Adventures is a Big Finish Productions audio play series based on the British science fiction television programme Doctor Who. It sees the return of Paul McGann reprising his role as the Eighth Doctor from the 1996 television movie.

History 

In 2001, Paul McGann became involved with Big Finish Productions producing adventures as the Eighth Doctor, a role he originated in the 1996 TV movie Doctor Who, as part of their ongoing Main Range. However, in 2007, due to the popularity of several of these titles on BBC Radio 7 (now known as BBC Radio 4 Extra), the BBC partnered with Big Finish to produce a series called The Eighth Doctor Adventures for BBC Radio 7 beginning with Blood of the Daleks, co-starring Sheridan Smith as the Doctor's latest companion Lucie Miller and featuring a guest appearance from a then fairly unknown Hayley Atwell. This range would go on for a further three seasons of stories, with Lucie initially departing in the 2009 Christmas special Death in Blackpool. The fourth season brought in Niky Wardley as the Doctor's new companion Tamsin Drew and reintroduced Carole Ann Ford as the Doctor's granddaughter Susan Foreman from the original television series, with Sheridan returning as Lucie later in the season. The range concluded in 2011 with the fourth season finale To the Death, which saw the deaths of both Lucie and Tamsin in a grim ending for the Doctor.

After the original end of The Eighth Doctor Adventures, November 2012 saw the return of the Eighth Doctor in a new boxset entitled Dark Eyes starring McGann alongside Ruth Bradley as new companion Molly O'Sullivan. The box set was a commercial success and won the BBC Audio Drama award for Best Online or Non-Broadcast Drama. This led to the commission of three further box sets continuing the Dark Eyes saga starting in 2014, which starred McGann and Bradley and introduced a second companion in Liv Chenka, played by BAFTA TV Award nominated actress Nicola Walker. Due to Bradley's limited availability, Molly was written out at the end of the third volume, though the character returned once more in the fourth volume played by Sorcha Cusack.

Following the success of Dark Eyes, the multi-volume boxset format was used extensively, starting with the four-part saga Doom Coalition from 2015 to 2017. McGann and Walker reprised their roles as the Eighth Doctor and Liv Chenka respectively, and were joined by new companion Helen Sinclair, portrayed by Hattie Morahan. It also featured the return of Alex Kingston as River Song in a recurring capacity, marking the first time elements from the revived iteration of the parent series Doctor Who appeared. Doom Coalition was followed by two more four-part sagas starring McGann, Walker, and Morahan as the Doctor, Liv, and Helen, which were entitled Ravenous (2018-2019) and Stranded (2020-2022). The end of Stranded depicted Liv's departure from the TARDIS, though it left a narrative gap for more adventures with the trio in the future.

Alongside the box sets with Liv and Helen, in 2017 Big Finish Productions began a new strand of stories set much later in the Eighth Doctor's life at the onset of the Time War. The Eighth Doctor: The Time War, as it was called, served as a prequel to The War Doctor and drew from the depiction of the Eighth Doctor in the 2013 minisode "The Night of the Doctor", which had marked McGann's first reprisal of the role on television since 1996 and also mentioned audio companions Charley, Lucie, Tamsin, and Molly on screen for the first time. The series starred McGann alongside Rakhee Thakrar as his companion Bliss, and  ran for four volumes through 2020. Additionally, two one-off box sets were released which featured the return of Sheridan Smith as Lucie Miller in 2019 and India Fisher as Charlotte Pollard in 2022 and were each set during their original runs.

In May 2020, Big Finish announced the Main Range would conclude in March 2021 and subsequently replaced with regular releases of each Doctor's adventures continuing in their own respective ranges. A previously released special title from 2003 and all the boxset series with the Eighth Doctor were united under the umbrella banner of The Eighth Doctor Adventures as part of this change. Two new standalone boxsets What Lies Inside? and Connections were announced for release in 2022, which featured the returns of McGann, Walker, and Morahan as the Doctor, Liv, and Helen.

Cast and characters

Notable guests

 Seán Carlsen as Narvin
 Sylvester McCoy as The Doctor
 Tim McMullan as The Eight
 Michael Jayston as The Valeyard

 Terry Molloy as Davros
 Ken Bones as The General
 Ian McNeice as Winston Churchill
 Jon Culshaw as Brigadier Lethbridge-Stewart

 Michelle Livingston as Deeva Jansen
 Shane Richie as Drax

Episodes

The Eighth Doctor Adventures

Special (2003)

Series 1 (2007)
The first series of the Eighth Doctor Adventures began with Blood of the Daleks, a two part story spread across two separate releases and showcasing a more violent approach.

Series 2 (2008)

Series 3 (2009)

Series 4 (2009–11)

Special (2010)

Dark Eyes

Series 1 (2012)

Series 2 (2014)

Series 3 (2014)

Series 4 (2015)

Doom Coalition

Series 1 (2015)

Series 2 (2016)

Series 3 (2016) 
Doom Coalition 3 was released in September 2016 and is directed by Ken Bentley.

Series 4 (2017) 
Doom Coalition 4 was released in March 2017 and is directed by Ken Bentley.

The Eighth Doctor: The Time War

Series 1 (2017)

Series 2 (2018)

This was the final box set to feature Jacqueline Pearce as Ollistra before her death in September 2018.

Series 3 (2019)

Series 4 (2020)

This box set features Ken Bones reprising his role of the General, a character who appeared in the Fiftieth Anniversary special "The Day of the Doctor" in 2013 and made one final appearance in the Series 9 episode "Hell Bent" in 2015.

Series 5: Cass (2023)

Series 6

Ravenous

Series 1 (2018)

Series 2 (2018)

Series 3 (2019)

Series 4 (2019)

Stranded

Series 1 (2020) 
Featuring the first appearance of Tania Bell (Rebecca Root), the first transgender companion in any Doctor Who media.

Series 2 (2021)

Series 3 (2021)

Series 4 (2022)

The Eighth Doctor Adventures (continued)

The Further Adventures of Lucie Miller (2019)
Announced in August 2018, this series is set between the first and second series of audio adventures.

Charlotte Pollard – The Further Adventuress (2022)

What Lies Inside? (2022)

Connections (2022)

The Eighth Doctor Adventures 2023A 
Two boxsets have been scheduled for 2023. Very few details have been revealed including casting details though McGann is expected to return. The first is scheduled for November 2023.

The Eighth Doctor Adventures 2023B 
The second is scheduled for December 2023.

Awards and nominations

References

Audio plays based on Doctor Who
Big Finish Productions
Doctor Who spin-offs
Eighth Doctor audio plays